Rooks County (standard abbreviation: RO) is a county located in the U.S. state of Kansas. As of the 2020 census, the county population was 4,919. The county seat is Stockton, and the largest city is Plainville. The county was named for Private John C. Rooks of the 11th Kansas Infantry who died at the Battle of Prairie Grove near Fayetteville, Arkansas, during the Civil War.

History

Early history

For many millennia, the Great Plains of North America was inhabited by nomadic Native Americans.  From the 16th century to 18th century, the Kingdom of France claimed ownership of large parts of North America.  In 1762, after the French and Indian War, France secretly ceded New France to Spain, per the Treaty of Fontainebleau.

19th century
In 1802, Spain returned most of the land to France, but keeping title to about 7,500 square miles.  In 1803, most of the land for modern day Kansas was acquired by the United States from France as part of the 828,000 square mile Louisiana Purchase for 2.83 cents per acre.

In 1854, the Kansas Territory was organized, then in 1861 Kansas became the 34th U.S. state.  In 1867, Rooks County was established.

In 1881, the first county courthouse was built in Stockton. The county jail was built nearby from cottonwood logs strengthened by tons of iron.

20th century
In 1923, a new courthouse opened in Stockton. The Rooks County Courthouse was added to the National Register of Historic Places in 2002.

Geography

Adjacent counties
Phillips County (north)
Smith County (northeast)
Osborne County (east)
Ellis County (south)
Trego County (southwest)
Graham County (west)

Demographics

As of the census of 2000, there were 5,685 people, 2,362 households, and 1,556 families residing in the county.  The population density was 6 people per square mile (2/km2).  There were 2,758 housing units at an average density of 3 per square mile (1/km2).  The racial makeup of the county was 97.13% White, 1.13% Black or African American, 0.42% Native American, 0.19% Asian, 0.02% Pacific Islander, 0.37% from other races, and 0.74% from two or more races.  1.06% of the population were Hispanic or Latino of any race.

There were 2,362 households, out of which 29.10% had children under the age of 18 living with them, 55.40% were married couples living together, 7.20% had a female householder with no husband present, and 34.10% were non-families. 31.80% of all households were made up of individuals, and 18.50% had someone living alone who was 65 years of age or older.  The average household size was 2.32 and the average family size was 2.93.

In the county, the population was spread out, with 25.20% under the age of 18, 6.40% from 18 to 24, 25.50% from 25 to 44, 21.50% from 45 to 64, and 21.50% who were 65 years of age or older.  The median age was 40 years. For every 100 females there were 98.10 males.  For every 100 females age 18 and over, there were 94.30 males.

The median income for a household in the county was $30,457, and the median income for a family was $36,931. Males had a median income of $26,794 versus $18,389 for females. The per capita income for the county was $15,588.  About 7.30% of families and 9.80% of the population were below the poverty line, including 9.70% of those under age 18 and 7.40% of those age 65 or over.

Government

Presidential elections

Rooks County is overwhelmingly Republican. No Democratic presidential candidate has won Rooks County since Franklin D. Roosevelt – ironically against Kansan Alf Landon – carried the county by eighty-five votes in 1936. The last Democrat to exceed a quarter of the county's vote was Michael Dukakis in 1988 during a major drought on the Great Plains.

Laws
Following amendment to the Kansas Constitution in 1986, the county remained a prohibition, or "dry", county until 2000, when voters approved the sale of alcoholic liquor by the individual drink with a 30 percent food sales requirement.

Education

Unified school districts
 Palco USD 269
limited to western edge of county; includes Palco, Damar and Zurich
 Plainville USD 270
southern half of county, except western edge zoned to Palco
 Stockton USD 271
northern half of county

Communities

Cities
 Damar
 Palco
 Plainville
 Stockton
 Woodston
 Zurich

Unincorporated communities
† means a Census-Designated Place (CDP) by the United States Census Bureau.
 Codell†
 Webster

Ghost towns

 Adamson
 Alcona
 Amboy
 Chandler
 Cresson
 Earnest
 Frankton
 Gould City
 Highhill
 Hoskins
 Igo
 Laton
 McHale
 Motor
 Nyra
 Portage
 Slate
 Sugarloaf
 Survey
 Rockport

Townships
Rooks County is divided into twelve townships.  None of the cities within the county are considered governmentally independent, and all figures for the townships include those of the cities.  In the following table, the population center is the largest city (or cities) included in that township's population total, if it is of a significant size.

See also

References

Further reading

 Standard Atlas of Rooks County, Kansas; Geo. A. Ogle & Co; 67 pages; 1905.

External links

County
 
 Rooks County - Directory of Public Officials
Maps
 Rooks County Maps: Current, Historic, KDOT
 Kansas Highway Maps: Current, Historic, KDOT
 Kansas Railroad Maps: Current, 1996, 1915, KDOT and Kansas Historical Society

 
Kansas counties
1867 establishments in Kansas
Populated places established in 1867